was a  after Shōchō and before Kakitsu. This period spanned the years from September 1429 through February 1441.

Change of era
 1429 : The era name was changed to mark the beginning of the reign of Emperor Go-Hanazono. The previous era ended and a new era commenced in Shōchō 1, on the 29th day of the 7th month, when the new emperor was proclaimed.

Events of the Eikyō era
 April 14, 1429 (Eikyō 1, 9th day of the 3rd month): Ashikaga Yoshinobu is honored in court; and thereafter, he is known as Yoshinori.
 1429: Yoshinori appointed shōgun.
 1430: Southern army surrenders.
 1432: Akamatsu Mitsusuke flees; Yoshinori receives rescript from China.
 1433 (Eikyō 5, 6th month):  The Emperor of China addressed a letter to shōgun Yoshinori in which, as a conventional aspect of the foreign relations of Imperial China, the Chinese assume that the head of the Ashikaga shogunate is effectively the "king of Japan".
 1433: Ōtomo rebels; Hieizan monks rebel.
 1434: Tosenbugyo established to regulate foreign affairs.
 1436: Yasaka Pagoda at Hokanji in Kyoto destroyed by fire.
 1439: Mochiuji is defeated, and he commits suicide; dissatisfaction with Yoshinori grows.
 1440: Yasaka Pagoda at Hokanji in Kyoto re-constructed by Yoshinori.
 1441: Yoshinori grants Shimazu suzerainty over Ryukyu Islands; Akamatsu murders Yoshinori—Kakitsu Incident; Yamana kills Akamatsu.

Notes

References
 Nussbaum, Louis Frédéric and Käthe Roth. (2005). Japan Encyclopedia. Cambridge: Harvard University Press. ; OCLC 48943301
 Titsingh, Isaac. (1834). Nihon Ōdai Ichiran; ou,  Annales des empereurs du Japon.  Paris: Royal Asiatic Society, Oriental Translation Fund of Great Britain and Ireland. OCLC 5850691

External links
 National Diet Library, "The Japanese Calendar" -- historical overview plus illustrative images from library's collection

Japanese eras
1420s in Japan
1430s in Japan
1440s in Japan